This is a list of Members of the Malaysian Parliament who represented multiple states during their federal parliamentary career.

Most people in the list represented different states in the Dewan Rakyat. Nobody has ever represented different states in the Dewan Negara, although various attempts have been made.

This list includes MPs who served in the past and who continue to serve in the present.

Members of the Malaysian Parliament who represented multiple states

References

Parliament of Malaysia

Malaysia